Andy Reid (born 1958) is the head coach of the Kansas City Chiefs of the NFL.

Andy or Andrew Reid may also refer to:

Andy Reid (Irish footballer) (born 1982), Irish footballer
Andrew Reid (lawyer) (born 1954), British lawyer, racehorse trainer, and Treasurer of the UK Independence Party
Andrew Reid (motorcyclist) (born 1994), British motorcycle racer
Andrew Reid (writer) (died  1767), Scottish writer
Andy Reid (Scottish footballer), footballer of the 1920s and 1930s
Andrew G. Reid (1878–1941), American football player, coach and athletics administrator
Andy Reid (running back) (born 1954), American football running back

See also
Andrew Reed (disambiguation)